Monoblemma is a genus of araneomorph spiders in the family Tetrablemmidae that was first described by Carl Eduard Adolph Gerstaecker in 1941.

Species
 it contains four species, found in Brazil, Panama, on Madagascar, in Colombia, and on the Virgin Islands:
Monoblemma becki Brignoli, 1978 – Brazil
Monoblemma browni Shear, 1978 – Madagascar
Monoblemma muchmorei Shear, 1978 – Virgin Is., Colombia
Monoblemma unicum Gertsch, 1941 (type) – Panama

See also
 List of Tetrablemmidae species

References

Araneomorphae genera
Spiders of Central America
Spiders of Madagascar
Spiders of South America
Tetrablemmidae